The 2004 South Dakota's at-large congressional district special election was held on July 12, 2004 to select the successor to Republican Representative Bill Janklow who resigned on July 11, 2004, following a conviction of vehicular manslaughter after an accident that had occurred months earlier, creating an open seat and necessitating a special election. Each party held a nominating convention to choose their nominee for the special election. Republicans selected state Senator Larry Diedrich over Barbara Everist, also a member of the South Dakota State Senate, as their nominee while Democrats chose attorney Stephanie Herseth, who had unsuccessfully challenged Janklow in 2002.

The special election was closely watched by both parties in an effort to gain momentum going into the 2004 House elections. The Hill committees of both parties spent a combined total of two million dollars on advertising in South Dakota. This election was especially important considering that five months later in addition to this House seat, Democratic Senator and Senate Minority Leader Tom Daschle's, who was facing a tough race against former Representative John Thune (R), who had come within 524 votes of defeating South Dakota's other Senator in 2002, U.S. Senate seat would also be up for election.

Herseth benefitted from her high name recognition from her previous run as well as her relation to the prominent Herseth family (one notable member of whom includes her grandfather Ralph Herseth, a former Governor of South Dakota). However, Vice President Dick Cheney (R) came to the Mount Rushmore state in March to campaign for Diedrich.

Herseth ultimately narrowly prevailed over Diedrich. The both of them won their primaries held on the same day as the special election and would face off against each other in November. Some Democrats claimed this victory, as well as another one in a special election in Kentucky's 6th congressional district months earlier, were harbingers of major Democratic victories in November. However, instead Republicans would achieve a net-gain of three seats in the House and a net-gain of four in the Senate (including a victory in South Dakota).

See also
2004 United States elections
108th United States Congress

References

South Dakota 2004 at-large
South Dakota 2004 at-large
2004 at-large Special
South Dakota at-large Special
United States House of Representatives at-large Special
United States House of Representatives 2004 at-large